The Associazione Guide e Scouts Cattolici Italiani (AGESCI) is a Catholic Scouting and Guiding association in Italy. It is coeducational and has 183,925 members, including 33,268 leaders (of whom 2,095 priests), 1,933 local groups and 6,287 units, making it the country's largest Scout association.

AGESCI was formed in 1974 upon the merger of the Associazione Scouts Cattolici Italiani (ASCI, founded in 1916) and the Associazione Guide Italiane (AGI, founded in 1943). Some ASCI and AGI leaders, who had disagreed with the merger (and, above all, opposed the principle of coeducation) and had refused to join AGESCI, formed the Associazione Italiana Guide e Scouts d'Europa Cattolici (AIGSEC/FSE) in 1976, along with disgruntled members of the early AGESCI.

Since 1986, AGESCI has formed, along with the 12,000-strong non-denominational Corpo Nazionale Giovani Esploratori ed Esploratrici Italiani (CNGEI), the Italian Scout Federation (FIS), Italy's national member of the World Organization of the Scout Movement (WOSM) and the World Association of Girl Guides and Girl Scouts (WAGGGS).

The Südtiroler Pfadfinderschaft (SP), a Catholic association in German-speaking South Tyrol, and the Slovenska Zamejska Skavtska Organizacija (SZSO), serving Slovenes in Friuli-Venezia Giulia, are AGESCI affiliates, albeit not members.

In 1986 Pope John Paul II was given the Wood Badge insignia as honorary AGESCI leader.

Organisation
AGESCI has a federal structure, composed of regional sections, provincial/diocesan sections and local groups.

The region with more AGESCI members is Veneto (13.2% of the total), followed by Emilia-Romagna (13.1%) and Lombardy (10.5%). As a result, 49.4% of AGESCI members are in Northern Italy (29.6% in Northeast Italy and 19.8% in Northwest Italy), 20.0% in Central Italy and 30.6% in Southern Italy and the Isles. Veneto is first also by groups (11.5%) and units (12.2%).

There are three age ranges/units in AGESCI (and they are present in most groups) following the old traditional age group format:
L/C: Lupetti and/or Coccinelle (Wolf Cubs and/or Brownies), aged 8–11/12, organised into packs.
E/G: Esploratori and Guide (Explorers and Guides), aged 11/12–16, organised into troops and patrols.
R/S: Rover and Scolte (Rover Scouts and Ranger Guides), aged 16–21, organised into crews.

Units can be only-male, only-female or coeducational. In the latter case they have to be led by a male leader and a female leader. Mono-sex E/G units are quite frequent (as of 2016, 46% of the total in Liguria, 40% in Marche, 40% in Emilia-Romagna, 35% in Sardinia, 34% in Campania, 32% in Tuscany, 32% in Veneto, 29% Sicily, etc.). L/C mono-sex units are rare and are more likely in regions where the Coccinelle have a strong tradition and presence (23% in Marche, 22% in Sardinia, 16% in Emilia-Romagna, 13% in Campania, 11% in Sicily, etc.). Finally, R/S mono-sex units are even rarer (5% in Sicily, 4% in Campania, 3% in Apulia, 2% in Abruzzo, 1% in Calabria and Lazio and none in the remaining fourteen regions).

Each group is co-ordinated by two group leaders and directed by a comunità capi (leaders' community), where all adult leaders and at least a priest belong. It meets quite often (weekly in most cases) to plan all educational activities in the group. Its work is driven by a multi-year (usually three-year) progetto educativo (educational plan), which gives a common thread to the programme of all units, ensuring a common focus across all age ranges.

Rover scouts and ranger guides may join the leaders' community upon completing their education and leaving the crew; more specifically, this moment is marked by a ceremony called partenza (departure).

In order to be awarded of the Wood Badge, scout leaders need to go through a lengthy training, mainly consisting of three formation camps, as well as a few years of service before, between and after these camps.

See also
Scouting and Guiding in Italy

References

External links
Official website

World Association of Girl Guides and Girl Scouts member organizations
World Organization of the Scout Movement member organizations
Scouting and Guiding in Italy
Organizations established in 1974